Aurel Bringolf (born 2 November 1987) is a Swiss handball player for TSV St. Otmar St. Gallen and the Swiss national team.

He represented Switzerland at the 2020 European Men's Handball Championship.

References

External links

1987 births
Living people
Swiss male handball players
People from Winterthur
Sportspeople from the canton of Zürich